Maham Aamir is a Pakistani actress who appears in Urdu-language television series. She is known for her role as Sualeha (witch) in Saaya and Noshi in Ready Steady Go.

Career
Aamir started her career as a host on Salam Sindh on Sindh TV. She made her acting debut with a supporting role in the 2014 ARY Digital television serial Doosri Biwi, and followed it with brief roles in several television serials. She portrays the lead role of Sauleha, a ghost, in the 2018 Geo TV horror serial Saaya. Later Maham appeared in Geo Entertainment popular soap serials like Rishton Ki Dor, Babul Ka Angna, Roshni and  Ek Hi Bhool. She also portrayed the role of a Punjabi girl in Teri Meri Jodi. She receives critical acclaim for her role of Noshi in comedy sitcom Ready Steady Go.

Filmography

Television

Web series

References

External links

Living people
Actresses from Karachi
Pakistani television actresses
1990 births